Gheorghe Brega (born 25 September 1951) is a Moldovan politician who was the acting Prime Minister of Moldova from 30 October 2015 to 20 January 2016. He served as Deputy Prime Minister for Social Affairs of Moldova from 30 July 2015 to 30 May 2017, and was a Member of the Moldovan Parliament from 2009 to 2015.

Biography 
Born in the village of Drepcăuți, Briceni District, Soviet Moldova, Brega graduated from Nicolae Testemiţanu State University of Medicine and Pharmacy in Chişinău in 1974. He was a member of the Parliament of Moldova from 2009 to 31 July 2015.

On 30 October 2015 he was named as acting prime minister (locum tenens), until Pavel Filip was chosen as a permanent replacement for Valeriu Streleț, and formed a new cabinet in which Brega continued his work as Deputy Prime Minister for Social Affairs. He was the first member and last of the Liberal Party (PL) to serve as prime minister in any capacity, even if acting.

Honours
National Order Star of Romania, rank of Grand Officer (2014)

References

External links 
 Gheorghe BREGA official site
 Gheorghe Brega pe site-ul Parlamentului Republicii Moldova
 Gheorghe Brega pe site-ul Parlamentului Republicii Moldova [old version]

1951 births
Living people
Liberal Party (Moldova) MPs
Moldovan MPs 2009
Moldovan MPs 2009–2010
Moldovan MPs 2010–2014
Moldovan MPs 2014–2018
Moldovan physicians
Prime Ministers of Moldova
Romanian people of Moldovan descent
Grand Officers of the Order of the Star of Romania